The Archivo General de la Nación del Perú is the national archive of Peru.

See also 
 List of national archives
 List of archives in Peru

External links 
 http://www.agn.gob.pe

Peru
Archives in Peru